Vale is the fifth studio album by American rock band Black Veil Brides, released on January 12, 2018, through Lava Records/Universal Republic Records. It is a prequel to their previous concept album Wretched and Divine: The Story of the Wild Ones. It is their final album to feature bassist Ashley Purdy before his split with the band in November 2019 as well as their final album to be released through Republic Records.

Track listing

Personnel

Black Veil Brides
 Andy Biersack – lead vocals
 Jake Pitts – guitar, co-producer
 Jeremy 'Jinxx' Ferguson – guitar, backing vocals
 Ashley Purdy – bass, backing vocals
 Christian "CC" Coma – drums, percussion

Production
 John Feldmann – production, recording at Foxy Studios, Los Angeles, CA
 Zakk Cervini – engineering, digital editing, additional production, mixing at Foxy Studios, Los Angeles, CA
 Matt Pauling – mixing at Foxy Studios, Los Angeles, CA
 Ted Jensen – mastering at Sterling Sound, New York, NY

Artwork
 Richard Villa III – cover illustration
 Alberto Erazo – packaging design
 Jonathan Weiner – photography

Charts

References

2018 albums
Black Veil Brides albums
Albums produced by John Feldmann
Albums produced by Jake Pitts
Concept albums